Miguel Agustín Gutiérrez De León (born February 11, 1992) is a professional Uruguayan footballer.

References

1992 births
Living people
Uruguayan footballers
Uruguayan expatriate footballers
Association football midfielders
Sociedade Esportiva e Recreativa Caxias do Sul players
Mineros de Zacatecas players
Club Atlético River Plate (Montevideo) players
O'Higgins F.C. footballers
Racing Club de Montevideo players
Talleres de Córdoba footballers
C.A. Cerro players
Boston River players
Cuiabá Esporte Clube players
Rampla Juniors players
Campeonato Brasileiro Série C players
Uruguayan Primera División players
Primera Nacional players
Chilean Primera División players
Uruguayan expatriate sportspeople in Chile
Uruguayan expatriate sportspeople in Argentina
Uruguayan expatriate sportspeople in Brazil
Uruguayan expatriate sportspeople in Mexico
Expatriate footballers in Chile
Expatriate footballers in Argentina
Expatriate footballers in Brazil
Expatriate footballers in Mexico